Lee Seung-hyung is a South Korean actor. He is best known as a supporting actor in television dramas, notably in Brilliant Legacy (2009) and Prosecutor Princess (2011).

Filmography

Television series

Film

Awards and nominations

References

External links
 
 
 
 

1968 births
Living people
People from Yangju
South Korean male television actors
South Korean male film actors
Kyung Hee University alumni